The 2009 Safeway Championship (Manitoba men's provincial curling championship) was held February 18-22 at the Selkirk Recreation Centre in Selkirk, Manitoba, Canada. The winner represented Manitoba at the 2009 Tim Hortons Brier in Calgary.

Teams

Draw Brackets
32 team double knockout with playoff round
Four teams qualify each from A Event and B Event

A Event

B Event

Results

Draw 1
February 18, 0830

Draw 2
February 18, 1215

Draw 3
February 18, 1600

Draw 4
February 18, 2015

Draw 5
February 19, 0830

Draw 6
February 19, 1215

Draw 7
February 19, 1600

Draw 8
February 19, 1945

Draw 9
February 20, 0830

Draw 10
February 20, 1215

Draw 11
February 20, 1600

Playoffs

Playoff round
8 team double knockout
Four teams qualify into Championship round

First round
February 20, 1945

Second round
February 21, 0900

Third round
February 21, 1400

Championship Round

1 vs. 2
February 21, 1900

3 vs. 4
February 21, 1900

Semifinal
February 22, 0930

Final
February 22, 1400

External links
Manitoba Curling Association
Official site

Safeway Championship, 2009
Sport in Selkirk, Manitoba
Curling in Manitoba
2009 in Manitoba
February 2009 sports events in Canada